Vaux-sur-Seulles is a commune in the Calvados department in the Normandy region in northwestern France.

Geography 
Vaux-sur-Seulles is located 6 kilometers from Bayeux, in the Bessin region. The town is crossed by the Seulles river.

Demographics 
In 2017, the municipality had 305 inhabitants.

See also
Communes of the Calvados department

References

Communes of Calvados (department)
Calvados communes articles needing translation from French Wikipedia